"Bugiardo" (Liar) is the first single released by Fabri Fibra from his third homonym solo studio album Bugiardo.

Charts

References

2006 singles
Fabri Fibra songs
Italian songs
2006 songs
Songs written by Fabri Fibra